The New York Public Library system includes libraries in Manhattan, the Bronx, and Staten Island. This page is organized by borough, and alphabetically. The boroughs of Brooklyn and Queens are supported by their own separate library systems.

Research libraries

Libraries in Manhattan

Libraries in the Bronx

Libraries in Staten Island

See also
 List of Brooklyn Public Library branches
 List of Carnegie libraries in New York City
 List of Queens Library branches

References

Further reading
 Dain, Phyllis. 2000. The New York Public Library: a universe of knowledge. New York: New York Public Library in association with Scala Publishers, London.
 Dierickx, Mary B. (1996). The Architecture of Literacy: The Carnegie Libraries of New York City. New York: Cooper Union for the Advancement of Science and Art and the New York City Dept. of General Services. .

External links
 New York Public Library Visual Materials 1875-, Collection at the New York Public Library Archives & Manuscripts.
 5 Design Concepts for New York's Branch Library of the Future, 2014
 Official map of locations

New York Public Library branches

Buildings and structures in Staten Island

New York
Library